Leninskoye is a rural locality (a selo) in Mishkinsky Selsoviet, Mishkinsky District, Bashkortostan, Russia. The population was 306 as of 2010. There are 7 streets.

Geography 
Leninskoye is located 10 km west of Mishkino (the district's administrative centre) by road. Voskhod is the nearest rural locality.

References 

Rural localities in Mishkinsky District